A highball is a type of alcoholic drink.

Highball may also refer to:

 Highball (film), a film by Noah Baumbach
 Highball Wilson (1878-1934), professional baseball pitcher
 Highball, a British bouncing bomb project from World War 2
 Highball (train), a high speed train given non-stop track clearance
 Highball, a climbing term for a very tall boulder problem
 USS High Ball, US Navy ship names
 Highball glass, a glassware used to serve highball cocktails and other mixed drinks
 A 1942 bouncing bomb

See also
 Lowball (disambiguation)